Song bells are a musical instrument in the keyboard percussion family. They are a mallet percussion instrument that is essentially a cross between the vibraphone, glockenspiel, and celesta. They have bars made of aluminum. 

They sound one octave down from the glockenspiel, or one octave above concert pitch and generally have a range of  octaves. Song bells have been made by various makers at different times but were first introduced by J. C. Deagan, Inc. in 1918 and manufactured by the company until 1924.

See also 
Glockenspiel
Vibraphone
Celesta

References 

Keyboard percussion instruments
Idiophones
Pitched percussion instruments
American musical instruments
Bells (percussion)